Timothy Eaton Business and Technical Institute, formerly Timothy Eaton Secondary School is a defunct high school in the L'Amoreaux area of Toronto, Ontario, Canada originally operated by the Scarborough Board of Education.

 The school was named after Timothy Eaton, the founder of the now-defunct Eaton's department store chain. The site is now a residential development called Eaton on the Park Townhomes.

See also
List of high schools in Ontario

References

External links

High schools in Toronto
Schools in the TDSB
Educational institutions established in 1971
Educational institutions disestablished in 2009
1971 establishments in Ontario
2009 disestablishments in Ontario
Toronto Lands Corporation
Education in Scarborough, Toronto
Eaton's
Demolished buildings and structures in Ontario